Bjørn Arild Lynne (born December 31, 1966) is a Norwegian sound engineer and music composer, now living and working in Stavern, Norway. He was also known as a tracker music composer under the name "Dr. Awesome" in the demoscene in the 1980s and 1990s when he released tunes in MOD format and made music for Amiga games.

In 1995 he moved to England and composed for Team17. He recorded albums in England, including the Timura trilogy, inspired by the books of Allan Cole. In 2005 he returned to Norway and started a music publishing company, Lynne Publishing AS and a royalty-free music / stock music service, Shockwave-Sound

He composed soundtracks for the games Worms and Seven Kingdoms, and for solo albums of fantasy and trance music. His tunes have also been used in television and film.

Composition
In the later 1980s and 1990s, Lynne worked in the demoscene using the name Dr. Awesome. As a member of "Crusaders" demo-group, he created numerous demo soundtracks and standalone tunes in Amiga tracker format. He made music for Amiga games like "Qwak", "Brat" and some others (see discography for more info) and recorded two studio albums: "Hobbits & Spaceships" and "Montage". Later on, some of these tracks would become parts of his "Decade" and "Revive" albums. In 2014, two albums were released with old, original recordings of his music. Lynne has published occasional electronic dance/trance music under the name "Divinorum", including a collaboration with Aural Planet, called "Power Liquids".

Lynne has composed music for film, including Walpurgisnacht and the C. S. Lewis biography Through a Lens Darkly. He has also composed or designed music for over 80 video games.

Discography

{| class="wikitable sortable plainrowheaders"
|+ Game soundtracks
|-
! scope="col" | Year
! scope="col" | Title
!Platform(s)
!Developer
! scope="col" class="unsortable" | Contribution
|-
| align="center"| 2007
! scope="row" | Magic Touch
|Browser
|Nitrome
| Music
|-
| align="center"| 2008
! scope="row" |Go Go UFO
|Browser
|Nitrome
|Music
|-
| align="center"| 2006
! scope="row" | Geneforge 4: Rebellion
|PC
|Spiderweb Software
| Intro music
|-
| align="center"| 2006
! scope="row" | Lemmings
|PSP
|Team17, Sony
| Sound effects
|-
| align="center"| 2005
! scope="row" | Squirrel Escape
|Browser
|ArcadeTown
| Sound effects
|-
| align="center"| 2005
! scope="row" | Zombieball
|N/A
|
| Game effects, voice recording, some music
|-
| align="center"| 2005
! scope="row" | The Lost City of Gold
|PC
|Anarchy Enterprises
| Music 
|-
| align="center"| 2005
! scope="row" | Worms 4: Mayhem
|PS2, XBOX, PC
|Team17
| Music
|-
| align="center"| 2005
! scope="row" | Midnight Strike
|Browser
|ArcadeTown
| Sound effects.
|-
| align="center"| 2005
! scope="row" | BumpCopter 2
|Browser
|ArcadeTown
| Sound effects.
|-
| align="center"| 2004
! scope="row" | Ahriman's Prophecy
|PC
|Amaranth Games
| Some music tracks
|-
| align="center"| 2004
! scope="row" | Worms Forts: Under Siege
|PS2, XBOX, PC
|Team17, Sega
| All music, sound effects and voice arrangement / editing / recording
|-
| align="center"| 2004
! scope="row" | Blox Forever
|Browser
|ArcadeTown
| Custom sound design.
|-
| align="center"| 2003
! scope="row" | Worms 3D
|GC, PS2, XBOX, PC
|Team17, Sega
| All music, sound effects and voice arrangement / editing / recording
|-
| align="center"| 2003
! scope="row" | Restaurant Empire
|PC 
|Enlight Software
| Developed with DirectMusic interactive music system (DirectX 8)
|-
| align="center"| 2003
! scope="row" | Catch the Sperm 3
|PC, Mobile phone
|Black Pencil Entertainment AG
| 
|-
| align="center"| 2001
! scope="row" | Hotel Giant
|PC
|Enlight Software, JoWood
| All music, sound effect and voice recording/processing
|-
| align="center"| 2001
! scope="row" | Worms Blast
|GBA, GC, PS2, PC
|Team17, Ubisoft
| All music, sound effects and voice editing (not GBA version). PC music (DirectX 8)
|-
| align="center"| 2001
! scope="row" | Capitalism II
|PC
|Enlight Software
| All music & sound effects
|-
| align="center"| 2001
! scope="row" | Worms World Party
|Dreamcast, PC
|Team17
| All music, sound effects and voice recording/processing
|-
| align="center"| 2001
! scope="row" | Bomberman Online
|Dreamcast
|Elkware
| 4 tracks of music
|-
| align="center"| 2001
! scope="row" | Stunt GP
|Dreamcast, PS2, PC
|Team17
| Music and sound-fx
|-
| align="center"| 2000
! scope="row" | Gate
|
|GateSoft
|
|-
| align="center"| 2000
! scope="row" | Ford Racing
|PS1, PC
|Elite Systems, Empire Interactive
| Music
|-
| align="center"| 2000
! scope="row" | Siege of Avalon
|PC
|Digital Tome
| All in-game General MIDI Music (not front-end music)
|-
| align="center"| 2000
! scope="row" | Spin Jam
|PS1
|Empire Interactive
| All music and sound-fx
|-
| align="center"| 2000
! scope="row" | Phoenix - Deep Space Resurrection
|PC
|Team17, MicroProse
| Music only
|-
| align="center"| 2000
! scope="row" | Virtual-U
|PC
|Enlight Software
| Features classical music by Handel – arranged for the game. Also original composition for the animated intro
|-
| align="center"| 1999
! scope="row" | Worms Armageddon
|PS1, Dreamcast, PC
|Team17, MicroProse
| Music and sound effects
|-
| align="center"| 1999
! scope="row" | Seven Kingdoms II: The Fryhtan Wars
|PC
|Enlight Software
| All music and sound effects
|-
| align="center"| 1999
! scope="row" | Arcade Pool 2
|PC
|Team17
| Music & SFX 
|-
| align="center"| 1998
! scope="row" | Nightlong: Union City Conspiracy
|PC
|Trecision, Team17
| Voice editing, Music
|-
| align="center"| 1998
! scope="row" | Worms 2
|PC
|Team17, MicroProse
| All music and SFX
|-
| align="center"| 1998
! scope="row" | Addiction Pinball' 'and Worms Pinball|PC
|Team17
| All music and sound effects
|-
| align="center"| 1997
! scope="row" | Seven Kingdoms|PC
|Enlight Software
| All music and sound effects
|-
| align="center"| 1997
! scope="row" | Dark Corona|MAC OS
|Algomedia Software
| Music
|-
| align="center"| 1996
! scope="row" | X2|PS1
|Team17
| All music, sound effects and voice editing/processing
|-
| align="center"| 1996
! scope="row" | World Rally Fever|PC
|Split, Team17
| Sound effects.
|-
| align="center"| 1995
! scope="row" | Worms|PC
|Team17
| Music, sound effects and voice editing/processing (not Game Boy version)
|-
| align="center"| 1995
! scope="row" | Alien Breed 3D|Amiga (1200 & CD32)
|Team17, Ocean Software
| Music & SFX
|-
| align="center"| 1993
! scope="row" | Qwak|Amiga
|Team17
| Music
|-
| align="center"| 1992
! scope="row" | Project X|Amiga
|Team17
| Includes one music track
|-
| align="center"| 1992
! scope="row" | Escape from Colditz|Amiga
|Digital Magic Software
| Music
|-
| align="center"| 1992
! scope="row" | Fantastic Voyage|Amiga
|Centaur Software
| Music
|-
| align="center"| 1991
! scope="row" | Cubulus|Amiga
|Software 2000
| Music
|-
| align="center"| 1991
! scope="row" | Brat|Amiga
|Foursfield, Image Works
| Music
|-
| align="center"| 1993
! scope="row" | Super Obliteration|Amiga
|David Papworth
| Music
|}

 As Dr. Awesome 

 Early Game Soundtracks (2014). Original video game music 
 Original Amiga Works (2014). Original versions of 103 tracks composed on the Amiga 
 Decade (1997). Published by Studio17 under Dr. Awesome. 55 minutes of music plus much demoscene MIDI, MOD and MP3 X2 (1996). Official soundtrack CD of the game X2.

 Miscellaneous Tokyo Getaway EP (2009) by Polygon Palace - contains a sample of Now What Medley by Lynne.Open Interactive / Sky Digital TV games (2001) Some music in the main game section.
 Solnatt The LaSalle Bank Chicago Marathon Course Video (2000) Music in a  video about training for Chicago Marathon Virtual Van Cortlandt Park'' (2000) Music in video about this cross country race.

References

External links

Bjørn Lynne music at the Shockwave Sound royalty-free music / stock music library

1966 births
Living people
New-age musicians
Video game composers
Demosceners
Norwegian electronic musicians
Norwegian audio engineers
Tracker musicians
People from Larvik